The Montenegrin Embassy inTirana (Montenegrin: Ambasada Crne Gore u Tirani) is Montenegro's diplomatic mission to Albania. It is located at Rr. Jul Varibova 11.

The current Ambassador of Montenegro to Albania is Željko Perović.

See also
 Montenegrin diplomatic missions

Tirana
Montenegro
Albania–Montenegro relations